David James Taylor (1889 – January 9, 1969) was an Ontario farmer and political figure. He represented Grey North in the Legislative Assembly of Ontario from 1919 to 1934 as a  Liberal-United Farmers, United Farmers, Progressive and finally Liberal-Progressive member.

He was born in Keppel Township, Ontario, the son of George Taylor, and was educated in Wiarton. He returned to take over the operation of the family farm. He resigned his seat in 1934 to accept an appointment as Deputy Minister of Game and Fisheries.

External links 

Beautiful stoney Keppel : including the village of Shallow Lake, 1855-1986, B Warrilow, B Siegrist, WB Shouldice (1986)

1889 births
1969 deaths
United Farmers of Ontario MLAs